Raazz Mahal is an Indian Hindi-language fantasy drama television series premiered on 28 November 2022 on Shemaroo Umang. Produced by Rashmi Sharma under the banner of Rashmi Sharma Telefilms, it stars Himanshu Soni, Neha Harsora and Ridheema Tiwari.

Plot

Cast
 Himanshu Soni as Adhiraj
 Neha Harsora as Sunaina
 Ridheema Tiwari as Chandralekha
 Vaidehi Nair
 Preeti Puri
 Aarav Chowdhary
 Arina Dey
 Himani Sharma

Production

Casting
Himanshu Soni as Adhiraj, and Neha Harsora as Sunaina were signed as the lead.

Ridheema Tiwari was cast to portray the negative lead.

Development
The series was announcement by Rashmi Sharma Telefilms for Shemaroo Entertainment. The shooting of the series began in November 2022, mainly shot at the Film City, Mumbai. The promos were released in November 2022. It premeried on 28 November 2022 on Shemaroo Umang.

References

External links
 
 Raazz Mahal - Dakini Ka Rahasya on ShemarooMe

2022 Indian television series debuts
Hindi-language television shows
Indian drama television series
Indian fantasy television series